Félix Ibarrondo (born 12 June 1943) is a French composer of Basque origin.

Life 
Ibarrondo was born in Oñati in the Gipuzkoa province of the Basque country in Spain. Coming from a musical family, he learned music theory with his father, Antonino. He then studied music at the San Sebastián and Bilbao conservatories, plus theology and philosophy.

In 1969, he moved to Paris where he studied with Max Deutsch, Henri Dutilleux and Maurice Ohana, the latter having a great influence on his work as a composer. He was also introduced to the electroacoustic music within the Groupe de recherches musicales.

His work covers all formations, vocal and instrumental, from orchestras to small chamber ensembles.

Works 
 Chamber music
 Et la vie était là… for string quartet (1973)
 Brisas for 9 instruments (1980)
 Phalène for string trio (1983)
 Orchestra
 Vague de fond, for large orchestra (1972)
 Sous l'emprise d'une ombre (1976)
 Izengabekoa (1978)
 Amairuk, for 12 strings and guitar (1979)
 Abyssal for 2 guitars and orchestra (1982)
 Eris for orchestra (1986)
 Irrintz for orchestra (1988)
 Naretzko Aiak, cello concerto (1991)
 Vocal
 Aitaren Extea, for tenor, 2 pianos, violin and percussion (1971)
 Musique pour la messe (1977)
 Trois chœurs Basques a capella
 Odolez (1979)
 Zoro dantzak (1981)
 Argiruntz (1983)
 Cibillak, for soprano, tenor, baritone, 2 clarinets and 3 cellos (1981)
 Oroïpen (1993)
 Ode à Martin for choir, soloist and small orchestra (1996)
 Gacela del adiós for soprano and ensemble (1998)
 Illindik (1999)
 Min dira (2004)
 Urrundik (2005)

Discography 
 Vocal works – Kaoli Isshiki (soprano), Pablo Márquez (guitar), Musicatreize, Chœur Contemporain, Roland Hayrabedian (2006, L'Empreinte digitale ED 13236) 
 Piano works - Alfonso Gómez (piano) (2010, Sinkro Records)

References

Bibliography

External links 
 Web 
 Biography on cdmc.asso.fr
 Short biography
 
 

1943 births
Living people
People from Oñati
École Normale de Musique de Paris alumni
20th-century French composers
21st-century French composers
Basque classical composers
French male composers
20th-century French male musicians
21st-century French male musicians
Spanish male musicians